(English: "Brothers of the Shadow - Sons of Light") is the tenth album by Popol Vuh. It was originally released in 1978 on Brain Records. In 2006 SPV re-released the album with one bonus track that was originally released on the remix compilation Sing, for Song Drives Away the Wolves in 1993. The first two tracks from this album were used for the soundtrack of Werner Herzog's film Nosferatu the Vampyre.

Track listing 
All tracks composed by Florian Fricke, except tracks 3 and 4 composed by Florian Fricke and Daniel Fichelscher.

  – 18:47
  – 5:52
  – 5:35
  – 5:57

2006 bonus track
"Sing, for Song Drives Away the Wolves" – 4:15

Personnel 
Florian Fricke – piano
Daniel Fichelscher – electric guitar, acoustic guitar, percussion

Guest musicians
Robert Eliscu – oboe
Alois Gromer – sitar
Ted de Jong – tamboura
A church choir ensemble from Munich
Guido Hieronymus – digital instruments (on track number 5, 2006 bonus track)

Credits 
Recorded at Bavaria Studio, Munich, on August 1978 
Engineered by Rudolf Wohlschager, assisted by Peter Eichenseher 
Produced by Gerhard Augustin for Gammarock Music

2006 edition bonus track, "Sing, for Song Drives Away the Wolves", recorded by Guido Hieronymus at New African Studio in Munich on December 5, 1992, and produced by Florian Fricke and Frank Fiedler.

External links 

http://www.popolvuh.nl/nosferatubds
http://www.enricobassi.it release information
http://www.venco.com.pl/~acrux/bruder.htm

Popol Vuh (band) albums
1978 albums
Brain Records albums
Popol Vuh (band) soundtracks
Albums produced by Gerhard Augustin